Gene Gutchë (born Romeo Maximilian Eugene Ludwig Gutschë; 3 July 1907, Berlin – 15 November 2000, White Bear Lake, Minnesota) was a German composer active primarily in America.

Gutchë earned degrees in business and economics but also studied piano with Ferruccio Busoni. In 1925 he moved to the United States, working in both fields. In the 1950s he attended graduate school in music at the University of Minnesota and the University of Iowa, studying under Philip Greeley Clapp and settling in Minneapolis. He withdrew his early compositions at this time. While much of his work is neo-Romantic, he also experimented with polytonality, serialism, and microtones.

Gutchë also published two books, Music of the People (1968) and Come Prima (1970).

Selected works
Orchestra
 Symphony No.1
 Symphony No.2 for chorus and orchestra, Op.14 (1951)
 Symphony No.3, Op.19
 Rondo Capriccioso, Op.21
 Dance Suite, Op.26 No.2
 Rhapsody, Op.26 No.3
 Holofernes Overture, Op.27 No.1 (1958)
 Judith Prologue, Op.27 No.2
 Concertino, Op.28 (1956)
 Symphony No.4 in one movement, Op.30 (1960)
 Symphony No.5 for string orchestra, Op.34 (1962)
 Bongo Divertimento, Op.35 (1965, revised 1993)
 Genghis Khan for winds and double basses, Op.37 (1963)
 Raquel, Op.38 (1967)
 Rites in Tenochtitlan, Op.39 No.1
 Hsiang Fei, Op.40 (1965)
 Gemini, Op.41 (1965)
 Aesop Fabler Suite, Op.43 (1967)
 Classic Concerto, Op.44 (1967)
 Symphony No.6, Op.45 (1970)
 Epimetheus USA, Op.46 (1969)
 Cybernetics XX, Op.47 (1972)
 Icarus, Op.48 (1975)
 Bi-Centurion, Op.49 (1975)
 Perseus and Andromeda XX, Op.50 (1977)
 Helios Kinetic, Op.52 (1978)

Concertante
 Concerto for piano and orchestra, Op.24
 Timpani Concertante, Op.31 (1963)
 Cantilena for horn and string orchestra (1950)
 Concerto for violin and orchestra, Op.36 (1962)

Chamber music
 String Quartet No.1 in E minor (1949)
 String Quartet in C minor, Op.12 No.1 (1950)
 String Quartet No.3, Op.12 No.3 (1951)
 Interlude for viola and piano, Op.25 (1956)
 String Quartet No.4, Op.29 No.1 (1960, revised 1982)
 String Quartet, Op.29 No.4
 Etude for Unaccompanied Cello, Op.42 (1966)

Piano
 Two Part Invention (1947)
 Fugue in C minor, Op.3 (1948)
 Theme and Variations, Op.6 No.2 (1949)
 Sonata, Op.6 No.3 (1963)
 Utilitarian Fugue, Op.9
 Sonata, Op.32 No.1 (1963)
 Sonata, Op.32 No.2 (1963)

Vocal
 Benediction for soprano and organ (1961)
 Lullaby for soprano and piano (1963)

Choral
 No Greater Love Has Man Than Mighty God Above, Hymn
 Alleluia, Op.33 (1961)
 Akhenaten (Eidetic Images) for tenor solo, chorus and orchestra, Op.51 No.2 (1978)
 Tibi Seris Tibi Metis, Op. 53 (1988–1989)

References
Don Randel. The Harvard Biographical Dictionary of Music. Harvard, 1996, p. 341.

External links
 Gene Gutchë website
 Interview with Gene Gutchë, June 11, 1986

1907 births
2000 deaths
German classical composers
University of Minnesota College of Liberal Arts alumni
20th-century classical composers
German male classical composers
20th-century German composers
20th-century German male musicians